On 18 July 1806, approximately  of gunpowder stored in a magazine (polverista) in Birgu, Malta, accidentally detonated. The explosion killed approximately 200 people, including British and Maltese military personnel, and Maltese civilians from Birgu. Parts of the city's fortifications, some naval stores, and many houses were destroyed. The accident was found to be the result of negligence while transferring shells from the magazine.

Background
In the 18th and early 19th centuries, the main gunpowder store in Birgu was located in a casemate within the city walls, close to the Porta Marina. This was an improvised measure; the casemate was not intended to be used as a gunpowder magazine, but such practice was common at the time. Gunpowder was also stored in casemates at other locations, such as Fort St. Angelo, Fort Ricasoli, and Mdina. The Birgu magazine was located close to civilian housing, and the residents had complained about the dangers before the explosion. Preparations had been made to find alternative sites but nothing had been done; the storerooms that were meant to store gunpowder were being used as barracks or military hospitals.

The 1806 explosion was not the first time that a gunpowder disaster occurred in Malta. On 12 September 1634, a gunpowder factory in Valletta blew up, killing 22 people and causing severe damage to the Church of the Jesuits and the nearby college. In 1662, gunpowder that was stored in an echaugette on one of Valletta's counterguards exploded after being hit by lightning, but there were no casualties.

Explosion
In July 1806, British forces in Malta were preparing artillery shells for shipment to Sicily, as ammunition stocks there were depleted due to the siege of Gaeta by the French. On 18 July, a working party of 13 men commanded by garrison gunner Bombardier Anderson were preparing a consignment of shells from the Birgu magazine, which was filled at full capacity with 370 barrels containing  of gunpowder, as well as 1,600 shells and grenades. Anderson was using a metal chisel to remove the fuses from live shells, which was contrary to instructions, and this resulted in sparks which caused a massive explosion at 06:15. 

Anderson and the working party were killed instantly, as were three British soldiers of the 39th (Dorsetshire) Regiment of Foot and 23 Maltese soldiers of the 2nd Provincial Battalion. Between 150 and 200 civilians from Birgu were also killed, and approximately 100 others were injured by falling debris. The explosion frightened the inhabitants of Birgu, and it was also heard in the nearby cities of Senglea and Cospicua, as well as in the surrounding villages.

The magazine was located within the city's fortifications, and a section of the walls "went up in the air" and left a large breach. The city gate at the Porta Marina, a small bastion, and part of a curtain wall were all destroyed and were never rebuilt. Parts of the Navy Store Houses were also damaged or destroyed during the explosion. Birgu's cityscape was also altered by the explosion, since a large number of houses were destroyed or damaged by the explosion itself and by the rocks which fell from the bastions. Four hundred ninety-three people reported property losses due to the explosion.

Aftermath
Many Maltese people were angered at the loss of lives caused by negligence on behalf of the military. Civil Commissioner Alexander Ball reported that:

Victims and their families were paid partial compensation, and Ball set up a committee overseeing aid distribution. He also urged the government to pay full compensation. This was initially denied, but eventually the poorer classes received a compensation equivalent to two-thirds of their property which had been destroyed, while those of the upper classes received half of the value of their property. In 1811, £18,066.5s.10d was evenly distributed among those who had claimed damages. A wine merchant named Woodhouse lost a large amount of wine and the government provided him with extensive storehouses at the former Slaves' Prison in Valletta as a compensation. The initial total estimated damage for rebuilding was estimated at £35,000. 

The affected area became known as l-Imġarraf (Maltese for "the destroyed"). A street close to where the explosion occurred is now known as Triq il-Vittmi tal-Porvlista (Maltese for "Polverista Victims Street"). The Vittoriosa Historical and Cultural Society installed a plaque at the St. Lawrence Cemetery on the 200th anniversary of the disaster in 2006, where most of the victims were buried.

Notes

References

Bibliography

Further reading
Page 86
Tragedja Kbira fil-Birgu (1806)
Birgu
Explosions in Malta
Non-combat military accidents
1806 disasters in Europe
1806 in Malta
July 1806 events
Explosions in 1806